The Robarts School for the Deaf is a provincial school in London, Ontario with residential and day programs serving elementary and secondary deaf and hard-of-hearing students.

Along with three (ECD and SJW) other provincial schools for the deaf in Ontario, it is operated by the Ministry of Education (Ontario) under Education Act of Ontario section 13 (1).

Teachers are both deaf and hearing.

Deaf student population approximately 25 students in the senior school and 40 students in the elementary school, total is 65 students.

Deaf students from Canada often attend Gallaudet University in Washington D.C. and Rochester Institute of Technology in Rochester, New York for post-secondary programs.

History 
Deaf population with english speaking was boom, 800 deaf kids in 1950's and 1,200 deaf kids in 1960's then Ontario government decided to opened 3rd deaf school in London, Ontario.

Deaf student population timeline 
 1973-1985 - 200
 1985-1995 - 150
 1995-2005 - 100
 2005-2019 - 80-65

Academic approach and languages of instruction 
The Robarts School for the Deaf uses a bilingual-bicultural approach to educating deaf and hard-of-hearing students. American Sign Language (ASL) and English are the languages of instruction.

References

External links 
 Robarts School for the Deaf

Schools for the deaf in Canada
Schools in London, Ontario